The canton of Le Crès is an administrative division of the Hérault department, southern France. It was created at the French canton reorganisation which came into effect in March 2015. Its seat is in Le Crès.

Composition 

It consists of the following communes:

Baillargues
Beaulieu
Castries
Le Crès
Montaud
Restinclières
Saint-Brès
Saint-Drézéry
Saint-Geniès-des-Mourgues
Sussargues
Vendargues

Councillors

Pictures of the canton

References 

Cantons of Hérault